A flying car or roadable aircraft is a type of vehicle which can function both as a road vehicle and as an aircraft. As used here, this includes vehicles which drive as motorcycles when on the road. The term "flying car" is also sometimes used to include hovercars and/or VTOL personal air vehicles. Many prototypes have been built since the early 20th century, using a variety of flight technologies. Most have been designed to take off and land conventionally using a runway. Although VTOL projects are increasing, none has yet been built in more than a handful of numbers.

Their appearance is often predicted by futurologists, and many concept designs have been promoted. Their failure to become a practical reality has led to the catchphrase "Where's my flying car?", as a paradigm for the failure of predicted technologies to appear. Flying cars are also a popular theme in fantasy and science fiction stories.

History

Early 20th century
In the late 1800s, American immigrant Gustave Whitehead designed aircraft with wheels and a gasoline-powered engine, including his no.21 model built in 1901. Consensus among historians is that Whitehead's no. 21 did not achieve sustained self-powered flight. Some historians continue to assert Whitehead's craft flew at various dates prior to the Wright Brothers' craft, based on a series of unverifiable and contradictory eye-witness accounts.

Aircraft designer Glenn Curtiss built his Autoplane in 1917. It had a pusher propeller for flight, with removable flight surfaces including a triplane wing, canard foreplane and twin tails. It was able to hop, but not fly.

In 1935, Constantinos Vlachos built a prototype of a 'tri-phibian' vehicle with a circular wing, but it caught fire after the engine exploded while he was demonstrating it in Washington, D.C. Vlachos was badly injured and spent several months in hospital. The machine is most notable for a newsreel that captured the incident.

The Autogiro Company of America AC-35 was a prototype roadable autogyro, flown on 26 March 1936 by test pilot James G. Ray. Forward thrust was initially provided by twin counter-rotating propellers for thrust, later replaced with a single propeller. On 26 October 1936, the aircraft was converted to roadable configuration.  Ray drove it to the main entrance of the Commerce Building, Washington, D.C., where it was accepted by John H. Geisse, chief of the Aeronautics Branch. Although it had been successfully tested, it did not enter production.

The first fixed wing roadable aircraft to fly was built by Waldo Waterman. Waterman was associated with Curtiss while Curtiss was pioneering amphibious aircraft at North Island on San Diego Bay in the 1910s. On 21 March 1937, Waterman's Arrowbile first took to the air. The Arrowbile was a development of Waterman's tailless aircraft, the Whatsit. On the ground and in the air it was powered by a Studebaker engine.

In 1942, the British army built the Hafner Rotabuggy, an experimental roadable autogyro that was developed with the intention of producing a way of air-dropping off-road vehicles. However, the introduction of gliders that could carry vehicles (such as the Waco Hadrian and Airspeed Horsa) led to the project's cancellation.

Late 20th century
Although several designs (such as the ConVairCar) have flown, none have enjoyed commercial success, and those that have flown are not widely known by the general public. The most successful example, in that several were made and one is still flying, is the 1949 Taylor Aerocar.

In 1946, the Fulton FA-2 Airphibian was an American made flying car designed by Robert Edison Fulton Jr., it was an aluminum-bodied car, built with independent suspension, aircraft-sized wheels, and a six-cylinder 165 hp engine. The fabric wings were easily attached to the fuselage, converting the car into a plane. Four prototypes were built. Charles Lindbergh flew it 1950 and, although it was not a commercial success (financial costs of airworthiness certification forced him to relinquish control of the company, which never developed it further), it is now in the Smithsonian.

The Aerocar, designed and built by Molt Taylor, made a successful flight in December 1949, and in following years versions underwent a series of road and flying tests. Chuck Berry featured the concept in his 1956 song "You Can't Catch Me", and in December 1956 the Civil Aviation Authority approved the design for mass production, but despite wide publicity and an improved version produced in 1989, Taylor did not succeed in getting the flying car into production. In total, six Aerocars were built. It is considered to be one of the first practical flying cars.

One notable design was Henry Smolinski's Mizar, made by mating the rear end of a Cessna Skymaster with a Ford Pinto, but it disintegrated during test flights killing Smolinski and the pilot.

Moller began developing VTOL craft in the late 1960s, but no Moller vehicle has ever achieved free flight out of ground effect. The Moller Skycar M400 was a project for a personal VTOL (vertical take-off and landing) aircraft which is powered by four pairs of in-tandem Wankel rotary engines. The proposed Autovolantor model had an all-electric version powered by Altairnano batteries. The company has been dormant since 2015.

In the mid-1980s, former Boeing engineer Fred Barker founded Flight Innovations Inc. and began the development of the Sky Commuter, a small duct fans-based VTOL aircraft. It was a compact,  two-passenger and was made primarily of composite materials. In 2008, the remaining prototype was sold for £86k on eBay.

21st century

In 2009 the U.S., the Defense Advanced Research Projects Agency (DARPA) initiated the $65 million Transformer program to develop a four-person roadable aircraft by 2015. The vehicle was to have had VTOL capability and a  range. AAI Corporation and Lockheed Martin were awarded contracts. The program was cancelled in 2013.

The Parajet Skycar utilises a paramotor for propulsion and a parafoil for lift. The main body consists of a modified dune buggy. Parajet flew and drove its prototype from London to Timbuktu in January 2009.

The Maverick Flying Dune Buggy was designed by the Indigenous People's Technology and Education Center of Florida as an off-road vehicle that could unfurl an advanced parachute and then travel by air over impassable terrain when roadways were no longer usable. The  'Maverick' vehicle is powered by a  engine that can also drive a five-bladed pusher propeller. It was initially conceived in order to help minister to remote Amazon rainforest communities, but will also be marketed for visual pipeline inspection and other similar activities in desolate areas or difficult terrain.

The Plane Driven PD-1 Roadable Glastar is a modification to the Glastar Sportsman GS-2 to make a practical roadable aircraft. The approach is novel in that it uses a mostly stock aircraft with a modified landing gear "pod" that carries the engine for road propulsion. The wings fold along the side, and the main landing gear and engine pod slide aft in driving configuration to compensate for the rearward center of gravity with the wings folded, and provide additional stability for road travel.

The Super Sky Cycle was an American homebuilt roadable gyroplane designed and manufactured by The Butterfly Aircraft LLC. It is a registered motorcycle.
At the 2014 Pioneers Festival at Wien (Austria) AeroMobil presented their version 3.0 of their flying car. The prototype was conceived as a vehicle that can be converted from an automobile to an aircraft. The version 2.5 proof-of-concept took 20 years to develop and first flew in 2013. CEO Juraj Vaculik said that the company planned to move flying cars to market: "the plan is that in 2017 we'll be able to announce ... the first flying roadster." In 2016, AeroMobil was test-flying a prototype that obtained Slovak ultralight certification. When the final product will be available or how much it will cost is not yet specified. In 2018, it unveiled a concept that resembled a flying sportscar with VTOL capability. 
The Aeromobil 2.5 has folding wings and a Rotax 912 engine. On 29 October 2014, Slovak startup AeroMobil s.r.o. unveiled AeroMobil 3.0 
at Vienna Pioneers Festival.

Klein Vision in Slovakia have developed a prototype AirCar, which drives like a sports car and for flight has a pusher propeller with twin tailbooms, and foldout wings. In June 2021, the prototype carried out a 35-minute flight between airports. It was type certified as an aircraft in January 2022.

The Terrafugia Transition is a roadable aircraft intended to be classed as a Personal Air Vehicle. An operational prototype was displayed at Oshkosh in 2008 and its first flight took place on 2009-03-05. It will carry two people plus luggage and its Rotax 912S engine operates on premium unleaded gas. It was approved by the FAA in June 2010.

The production-ready single-engine, roadable PAL-V Liberty autogyro, or gyrocopter, debuted at the Geneva Motor Show in March 2018, then became the first flying car in production, and was set to launch in 2020, with full production scheduled for 2021 in Gujarat, India. the PAL-V ONE is a hybrid of a gyrocopter with a leaning 3-wheel motorcycle. It has two seats and a 160 kW flight certified gasoline engine.

On 15 April 2021, Los Altos, California, became home to the world's first consumer flying car showroom. However, as yet there are no certified flying cars in production.

Design
A flying car must be capable of safe and reliable operation both on public roads and in the air. For mass adoption, it will also need to be environmentally friendly, able to fly without a fully qualified pilot at the controls, and come at affordable purchase and running costs.

Design configurations vary widely, from modified road vehicles such as the AVE Mizar at one extreme to modified aircraft such as the Plane Driven PD-1 at the other. Most are dedicated flying car designs. While wheeled propulsion is necessary on the road, in the air lift may be generated by fixed wings, helicopter rotors or direct engine power. The Alef Model A project offers an unusual configuration in which the body of the car is hollow and the sides are slabs; in the air it rolls sideways so that the slabs become a biplane wing. The cabin remains upright.

Lift
Like other aircraft, lift in flight is provided by a fixed wing, spinning rotor or direct powered lift. The powered helicopter rotor and direct lift both offer VTOL capability, while the fixed wing and autogyro rotor take off conventionally from a runway.

The simplest and earliest approach was to take a driveable car and attach removable flying surfaces and propeller. However when on the road, such a design must either tow its removable parts on a separate trailer or leave them behind and drive back to them before taking off again.

Other conventional takeoff fixed-wing designs, such as the Terrafugia Transition, include folding wings that the car carries with it when driven on the road.

Vertical takeoff and landing (VTOL) is attractive, as it avoids the need for a runway and greatly increases operational flexibility. Typical designs include rotorcraft and ducted fan powered lift configurations. Most design concepts have inherent problems.

Rotorcraft include helicopters with powered rotors and autogyros with free-spinning rotors. For road use, a rotor must, like many naval helicopters, be either two-bladed or foldable. The quadcopter requires only a simple control system with no tail. The autogyro relies on a separate thrust system to build up airspeed, spin the rotor and generate lift. However, some autogyros have rotors that can be spun up on the ground and then disengaged, allowing the aircraft to jump-start vertically. The PAL-V Liberty is an example of the autogyro type.

Ducted-fan aircraft such as the Moller Skycar tend to easily lose stability and have been unable to travel at greater than 30–40 knots.

Power
The flying car places unique demands on the vehicle power train. For a given all-up weight, an aero engine must deliver higher power than its typical road equivalent. However on the road the vehicle must handle well and not be overpowered. Power must also be diverted between the airborne and road drive mechanisms. Some designs therefore have multiple engines, with the road engine being supplemented, or even replaced by, additional flight engines.

As with other vehicles, power has traditionally been supplied by internal combustion engines, but electric power is undergoing rapid development. It is coming into increasing use on road vehicles, but the weight of the batteries currently makes it unsuited to aircraft. However its low environmental signature makes it attractive for the short trips and dense urban environments envisaged for the flying car.

On the road, most flying cars drive the road wheels in the conventional way. A few use the aircraft propeller in similar manner to an airboat, but this is inefficient.

In the air, a flying car will typically obtain forward thrust from one or more propellers or ducted fans. A few have a powered helicopter rotor. Jet engines are not used due to the ground hazard posed by the hot, high-velocity exhaust stream.

Safety
In order to operate safely, a flying car must be certified independently as both a road vehicle and an aircraft, by the respective authorities. The person controlling the vehicle must also be licensed as both driver and pilot, and the vehicle maintained according to both regimes.

Mechanically, the requirements of powered flight are so challenging that every opportunity must be taken to keep weight to a minimum. A typical airframe is therefore lightweight and easily damaged. On the other hand, a road vehicle must be able to withstand significant impact loads from casual incidents while stationary, as well as low-speed and high-speed impacts, and the high strength this demands can add considerable weight. A practical flying car must be both strong enough to pass road safety standards and light enough to fly. Any propeller or rotor blade also creates a hazard to passers-by when on the ground, especially if it is spinning; they must be permanently shrouded, or folded away on landing.

For widespread adoption, as envisaged in the near future, it will not be practicable for every driver to qualify as a pilot and the rigorous maintenance currently demanded for aircraft will be uneconomic. Flying cars will have to become largely autonomous and highly reliable. The density of traffic will require automated routing and collision-avoidance systems. To manage the inevitable periodic failures and emergency landings, there will need to be sufficient designated landing sites across built-up areas. In addition, poor weather conditions could make the craft unsafe to fly.

Regulatory regimes are being developed in anticipation of a large increase in the numbers of autonomous flying cars and personal air vehicles in the near future, and compliance with these regimes will be necessary for safe flight.

Control
A basic flying car requires the person at the controls to be both a qualified road driver and aircraft pilot. This is impractical for the majority of people and so wider adoption will require computer systems to de-skill piloting. These skills include aircraft manoeuvring, navigation and emergency procedures, all in potentially crowded airspace. The onboard control system will also need to interact with other systems such as air traffic control and collision-risk monitoring. A practical flying car may need to be capable of full autonomy, in which people are present only as passengers.

Environment
A flying car capable of widespread use must operate acceptably within a heavily populated urban environment. The lift and propulsion systems must be quiet enough not to cause a nuisance, and must not create excessive pollution. For example, pollution emissions standards for road vehicles must be met.

The clear environmental benefits of electric power are a strong incentive for its development.

Cost
The needs for the propulsion system to be both small and powerful, the vehicle structure both light and strong, and the control systems fully integrated and autonomous, can only be met at present, if at all, using advanced and expensive technologies. This may prove a significant barrier to widespread adoption.

Flying cars are used for relatively short distances at high frequency. They travel at lower speeds and altitudes than conventional passenger aircraft. However optimal fuel efficiency for aeroplanes is obtained at higher speeds and altitudes, so a flying car's energy efficiency will be lower than that of a conventional aircraft. Similarly, the flying car's road performance is compromised by the requirements of flight and the need to carry around the various extra parts, so it is also less economical than a conventional motor car.

Industry groups
In April 2012, the International Flying Car Association was established to be the "central resource center for information and communication between the flying car industry, news networks, governments, and those seeking further information worldwide". Because flying cars need practical regulations that are mostly dealt with on a regional level, several regional associations were established as well, with the European Flying Car Association (EFCA) representing these national member associations on a pan-European level (51 independent countries, including the European Union Member States, the Accession Candidates and Russia, Switzerland, Turkey, Ukraine). The associations are also organizing racing competitions for roadable aircraft in Europe, the European Roadable Aircraft Prix (ERAP), mainly to increase awareness about this type of aircraft among a broader audience.

List of actual, claimed and proposed flying cars 

|-
| Aerauto PL.5C
| Italy
| Folding wings
| 1949
| Flown
| 1
| 
|-
| Aerocar
| US
| Detachable wings
| 1946
| Flown
| 5
| 4 Aerocars and one Aerocar III built (The Mk. II was not a flying car).
|-
| Aerocar 2000
| US
| Detachable wings
| 2000 approx.
| Flown
| 
| 
|-
| AeroMobil
| Slovakia
| Folding wings
| 2013
| Flown
| 
| v3.0 crashed. 4.0 under development
|-
| Alef Model A
| US
| Tilting biplane
| 2022
| Unbuilt
| 0
| Attracted significant investment.
|-
| Audi Pop.Up Next
| Germany
| Quadcopter
| 2018
| Unbuilt
| 1
| 
|-
| Autogiro Company of America AC-35
| US
| Autogyro
| 1935
| Flown
| 1
| 
|-
| AVE Mizar
| US
| Detachable wings
| 1971
| Not flown
| 1
| 
|-
| Bel Geddes' "Motorcar No. 9."
| US
| Folding wings
| 1945
| Unbuilt
| 
| Concept 
|-
| Bryan Autoplane 
| US
| Folding wings
| 1953
| Flown
| 2
| Model II converted to Model III.
|-
| Butterfly Super Sky Cycle
| US
| Flown
| 2009
| Flown
| 
| Homebuild autogyro. Registered motorcycle
|-
| Convair Model 116 ConVairCar
| US
| Detachable wings
| 1946
| Flown
| 1
| 
|-
| Convair Model 118 ConVairCar
| US
| Detachable wings
| 1947
| Flown
| 2
| Second vehicle re-used the aircraft section from the first.
|-
| Curtiss Autoplane
| US
| Detachable wings
| 1917
| Not flown
| 1
| Achieved short hops
|-
| Dixon Flying Ginny
| US
| Helicopter
| 1940
| Flown
| 1
| Co-axial rotor.
|-
| Ford Volante
| US
| Ducted fan
| 1958
| Unbuilt
| 
| Concept.
|-
| Fulton Airphibian
| US
| Detachable wings
| 1946
| Flown
| 4
| 
|-
| Hafner Rotabuggy
| UK
| Detachable rotor
| 1942
| Flown
| 
| Willys MB jeep, air-towed as a rotor kite.
|-
| I-TEC Maverick
| US
| Parafoil
| 2008
| Flown
| 
| 
|-
| Klein Vision AirCar
| Slovakia
| Folding wings
| 2021
| Flown
| 1
| Production model in development.
|-
| Lebouder Autoplane
| France
| Detachable wings
| 1973
| Flown
| 1
| Won prizes.
|-
| Moller M400 Skycar
| US
| Vectored fan
| 1960s
| Not flown
| 
| Unsuccessful as of 2019
|-
| Monster Garage "Red Baron"
| US
| Detachable wings
| 2005
| Flown
| 1
| Based on a Panoz Esperante sports car, with detachable airframe.
|-
| PAL-V Liberty
| Netherlands
| Autogyro
| 2012
| Flown
| 
| Production model under development.
|-
| Parajet Skycar
| UK
| Parafoil
| 2008
| Flown
| 1
| 
|-
| Piasecki VZ-8 Airgeep
| US
| Ducted rotor
| 1959
| Flown
| 
| VTOL "flying jeep".
|-
| Plane Driven PD-1
| US
| Folding wings
| 2021
| Flown
| 2
| Modified Glasair Sportsman 2+2 aircraft. The second prototype is designated the PD-2.
|-
| Scaled Composites Model 367 BiPod
| US
| Detachable wings
| 2011
| Not flown
| 1
| Twin-fuselage technology development vehicle. Not flown.
|-
| Skroback Roadable Airplane
| US
| Multiplane
| 1925
| Not flown
| 1
| 
|-
| SkyRider X2R
| US
| 
| 
| Unbuilt
| 
|-
| Taylor Aerocar
| 
| 
| 
| 
| 
| See Aerocar
|-
| Terrafugia Transition
| US
| Folding wings
| 2009
| Flown
| 
| 
|-
| Terrafugia TF-X
| US
| Hybrid
| 
| Unbuilt
| 
| VTOL convertiplane with folding wings and rotors.
|-
| Urban Aeronautics X-Hawk
| Israel
| 
| 
| Unbuilt
| 
| VTOL. Under development. 
|-
| Vlachos Triphibian
| US
|
| 1936
| 
| 
| 
|-
| Wagner Aerocar
| Germany
| Helicopter
| 1965
| Flown
| 
| 
|-
| Waterman Arrowbile
| US
| Folding wings
| 1935
| Flown
| 1
| 
|-
| Whitehead No. 21
| US
| Folding wings
| 1901
| Not flown
| 1
| Historical consensus is that Whitehead's machine did not achieve self-powered flight.
|}

Popular culture
The flying car was and remains a common feature of conceptions of the future, both predicted and imaginary.

Anticipation
Flying cars have been under development since the early days of motor transport and aviation, and many futurologists have predicted their imminent arrival. Aircraft manufacturer Glenn Curtiss unveiled his unflyable Autoplane in 1917. In 1940, vehicle manufacturer Henry Ford predicted that; "Mark my word: a combination airplane and motorcar is coming. You may smile, but it will come.”

From 1945, industrial designer Norman Bel Geddes promoted his concept for a streamlined flying car with folding wings. In the late 1950s, Ford's Advanced Design studio publicised a 3/8 scale concept car model, the Volante Tri-Athodyne. It featured three ducted fans, each with its own motor, that would lift it off the ground and move it through the air. Ford admitted that "the day where there will be an aero-car in every garage is still some time off", also suggesting that "the Volante indicates one direction that the styling of such a vehicle would take".

Where's my flying car?
Despite a century of anticipation, no flying car has yet proved a practical proposition and they remain an experimental curiosity. This long-term failure to make any impact on society has led to the meme, "Where's my flying car?"

The question "Where's my flying car?" has become emblematic of the wider failure of many modern technologies to match futuristic visions that were promoted in earlier decades.

Fictional flying cars

The flying car has been depicted in many works of fantasy and science fiction. Some notable examples include:

Supercar starred in its own children's TV show in the UK, between 1961 and 1962. It was jet-powered with VTOL capability, and on the road it hovered rather than used wheels. Created by Gerry Anderson, it was the first show to credit his supermarionation puppet technology.
The Jetsons American animated cartoon sitcom was originally aired from 1962 to 1963. It featured flying cars as ubiquitous. They typically had a large bubble roof, the design being inspired by a Ford concept road car from 1954, the FX-Atmos.
A flying 1974 AMC Matador coupe features in The Man with the Golden Gun (1974), the ninth in the James Bond film series. The Matador coupe is transformed into an aeroplane in similar manner to the AVE Mizar, by attaching a large wing with engine and tail unit to the car. The film prop was not airworthy and a -long remote control model was used for the aerial sequences.
In the Blade Runner (original 1982) films, flying cars are called spinners. They have vertical take-off and landing (VTOL) capability. The vehicle was conceived and designed by Syd Mead who described it as an "aerodyne"—a vehicle which directs air downward to create lift, though press kits for the film stated that the spinner was propelled by three engines: "conventional internal combustion, jet, and anti-gravity" A Spinner prop is on permanent exhibit at the Science Fiction Museum and Hall of Fame in Seattle, Washington.
In the Back to the Future (1985) films, the DeLorean time machine car is also capable of normal flight.
In the film The Fifth Element (1997), as with The Jetsons, flying cars are the main means of personal transport. The production design for the film was developed by French comics creators Jean Giraud and Jean-Claude Mézières. Director Luc Besson had been inspired by Mézières' book The Circles of Power.

See also
 Amphibious automobile
 Intermodal passenger transport

References

Further reading
 BBC News Flying cars in 25 years, BBC News Online, 22 September 2004.
 Brown, Stuart F. Why We're Not Driving the Friendly Skies, The New York Times online, 22 August 2014, and in print on 24 August 2014, on p. AU1 of the New York edition.
 Feltman, Rachel. Why Don't We Have Flying Cars?, Popular Mechanics, 21 February 2013.
 Hakim, Danny. A Helicopter of One's Own, The New York Times online, 16 June 2014, and in print on 17 June 2014, p. D2 of the New York edition.
 Hodgdon, Theodore, A.; Onosko, Tim (ed.) "At Last —a Convertible Auto-Plane", in Wasn't the Future Wonderful?: A View of Trends and Technology from the 1930s, Dutton, 1979, pp. 152–153, .

External links

 Roadable Times, pictures and descriptions of over 70 designs of flying cars and roadable aircraft past and present.
 How Flying Cars Will Work at HowStuffWorks.

Emerging technologies